Marott Hotel is a historic residential hotel building located at Indianapolis, Indiana.  It was built in 1926, and consists of two 11-story, reinforced concrete structures faced in red brick with ornamental terra cotta and glazed tile trim in the Georgian Revival style.  The two towers are connected by a one-story structure that contained the lobby, event halls, gym, and indoor pool.

It was listed on the National Register of Historic Places in 1982.

References

External links

Hotel buildings on the National Register of Historic Places in Indiana
Georgian Revival architecture in Indiana
Colonial Revival architecture in Indiana
Hotel buildings completed in 1926
Residential buildings in Indianapolis
National Register of Historic Places in Indianapolis